The position of Officer in Charge (OIC) in the context of Philippine governance refers to an official serving their position in an interim or temporary basis or even as the Caretaker or Custodian of the office. The position of OIC is distinct to an official serving in an "Acting" capacity.

Local government units
The local chief executive in local government units (e.g. the governor of province, mayor of a municipality or city), according to the implementing rules and regulations of the Local Government Code may designate an Officer in Charge (OIC) whenever they travel outside the area of their jurisdiction but still within the Philippines for a period not exceeding three consecutive days. The OIC of the local chief executive office is to be appointed in writing with duties to be performed by the temporary official also specified excluding powers to appoint, dismiss, or suspend government employees. The functions of the OIC is limited to powers involving administration and excludes discretionary powers.

In contrast a local chief executive serving in an "Acting Capacity", the position may be assumed due to the temporary incapacity of the local chief executive due to filing a leave of absence, travel outside the Philippines, or physical and legal reasons. The deputy of the local chief executive (in case of the provincial governor and municipal/city mayor or the highest-ranking member of the sangguiniang barangay in the case of the local barangay chief executive, physical and legal reasons. An acting local chief executive can only exercise powers to appoint, dismiss, or suspend government employees after 30 working days.

By agency

Philippine National Police
In the Philippine National Police an Officer in Charge is different from an acting official in terms on how they gained the position. For example, Deputy Director for Operations General Leonardo Espina became the OIC Police Chief when Director General Alan Purisima was suspended and Deputy Director for Administration Felipe Rojas retired. An acting official gained position by appointment of a higher authority.

When Oscar Albayalde went to non-duty status, the first chief to do so, amidst a controversy he was implicated in, Lt. Gen. Archie Gamboa, the Deputy Chief for Administration assumed the post of OIC of the police. Non-duty status is a status in the police similar to an employee on a terminal leave. Albayalde resigned from his position as chief while remaining a member of the police force until November 8, 2019, which is when he will reach the mandatory retirement age of 56. While on non-duty status, Albayalde retains his four star (Police General) rank which meant his successor will not be able to hold the same rank while Albayalde is still on non-duty status. On March 8, 2022 one day before the 2022 National and Local Elections, PGen. Dionardo Carlos finished his term as Chief, PNP upon reaching the mandatory retirement age of 56. He was replaced by the Deputy Chief for Operations PLtGen. Vicente Danao Jr. who was appointed by President Rodrigo Roa Duterte as the OIC of the PNP until President Ferdinand R. Marcos Jr. appointed PGen. Rodolfo Azurin Jr. as the New Chief, PNP.

Office of the President
During the administration of presidents Arroyo, Aquino III, and Duterte, the Executive Secretary is hereby designated as the Officer in Charge of the Office of the President when the President is out of the country for an Official State or Working Visit. During the administration of President Bongbong Marcos, the vice president of the Philippines is designated as Officer in Charge when the President is on Official State or Working Visit.

References

Politics of the Philippines